Barbara West Carpenter is an American politician serving as a member of the Louisiana House of Representatives from the 63rd district, where she has served since 2015.

Education 
Carpenter received a Bachelor of Science in vocational education and general science and a Master of Education in secondary education and administration from Southern University. She went on to earn her PhD in adult and occupational education and international education from Kansas State University.

Career 
Carpenter is the dean of international education and university outreach of Southern University.

In the Louisiana House of Representatives, Carpenter serves as chair of Labor and Industrial Relations Committee. She is a part of the Capital Region Legislative Delegation, the Democratic Caucus, the Louisiana Legislative Black Caucus, and the Louisiana Legislative Women's Caucus.

References

Living people
Democratic Party members of the Louisiana House of Representatives
Year of birth missing (living people)
Southern University alumni
Southern University faculty
Kansas State University alumni
Place of birth missing (living people)
21st-century American politicians